Young Guns of Texas is a 1962 American Western film directed by Maury Dexter and starring James Mitchum, Alana Ladd and Jody McCrea.  The supporting cast features Chill Wills, Gary Conway and Robert Lowery.

Plot

Tyler Duane (Gary Conway) is expelled from West Point after the Civil War when his brother, a Union officer, is accused of stealing Army funds.

Cast
 James Mitchum as Morgan Coe  
 Alana Ladd as Lily Glendenning  
 Jody McCrea as Jeff Shelby  
 Chill Wills as Preacher Sam Shelby  
 Gary Conway as Tyler Duane
 Barbara Mansell as Martha Jane Canary  
 Robert Lowery as Jesse Glendenning  
 Troy Melton as Luke  
 Fred Krone as Pike - Glendenning's Foreman
 Alex Sharp as Red
 Robert Hinkle as Sheriff Simon
 Will Wills as Charlie

Production
Filming took place in August 1962 in Big Bend National Park, Texas. Saguaro cacti, seen throughout the film, however, only grow in Arizona, necessitating filming in Tucson, Arizona's old Tucson Studios.

References

External links 
 
 
 

1962 films
1962 Western (genre) films
Films set in Texas
1960s English-language films
20th Century Fox films
CinemaScope films
American Western (genre) films
Films scored by Paul Sawtell
Films directed by Maury Dexter
1960s American films